Meath East is a parliamentary constituency represented in Dáil Éireann, the lower house of the Irish parliament or Oireachtas. The constituency elects 3 deputies (Teachtaí Dála, commonly known as TDs) on the system of proportional representation by means of the single transferable vote (PR-STV).

History and boundaries
It was established by the Electoral (Amendment) Act 2005 when the previous 5-seat Meath constituency was divided into two 3-seat constituencies of Meath East and Meath West. It was first used at the 2007 general election to the 30th Dáil.

It spans the eastern portions of County Meath. It includes Nobber, Slane, Dunboyne, Kells and Ashbourne, the constituency's biggest town.

The Electoral (Amendment) (Dáil Constituencies) Act 2017 defines the constituency as:

TDs

Elections

2020 general election

2016 general election

2013 by-election
Following the death of Fine Gael TD Shane McEntee, a by-election was held on 27 March 2013, the seat was won by his daughter Helen McEntee.

2011 general election

2007 general election

See also
Dáil constituencies
Elections in the Republic of Ireland
Politics of the Republic of Ireland
List of Dáil by-elections
List of political parties in the Republic of Ireland

References

Dáil constituencies
Politics of County Meath
2007 establishments in Ireland
Constituencies established in 2007